Amit Krushna Ghoda is an Indian politician and member of the 13th Maharashtra Legislative Assembly. He represented the Palghar Assembly Constituency as member of Shiv Sena. He defeated Ex Minister Rajendra Gavit by margin of 18,948 in Palghar Assembly By-Election in February 2016.

Positions held
 2016: Elected to Maharashtra Legislative Assembly

See also
 Palghar Lok Sabha constituency

References

External links
 Shiv Sena Official website

Maharashtra MLAs 2014–2019
Shiv Sena politicians
People from Palghar
Living people
Year of birth missing (living people)
Place of birth missing (living people)
Marathi politicians
Nationalist Congress Party politicians